Ciby Bhuvana Chandran (born 5 August 1991) is an Indian actor who works predominantly in Tamil cinema. He made his debut as a minor character in O Kadhal Kanmani (2015) before playing the protagonist in Vanjagar Ulagam (2018). He also participated in the reality show Bigg Boss Tamil Season 5 as a contestant.

Early and personal life 
Ciby was born in Tenkasi, Tamil Nadu and later moved to Salem, Tamil Nadu. After this, he moved to Chennai. His father is a doctor. While in college, he starred in short films. He married Shloka whom he met after returning from the United Kingdom on November 14.

Career

Film
Ciby's first movie was O Kadhal Kanmani, where he played a friend of Dulquer Salmaan in a minor role. His major breakthrough role came when he played one of the lead protagonists in the film Vanjagar Ulagam. This earned him some fame, which led him to another breakthrough performance in the 2021 movie Master. He starred opposite Vijay, where he played a student of his, and also appeared in the song "Vaathi Coming". Ciby appeared as a henchman of the antagonist Vinay Rai in the 2022 film Etharkkum Thunindhavan.

TV
Ciby participated in Season 5 of the Tamil reality television series Bigg Boss. He walked out of the show on Day 95 with a cash prize of 12 lakhs..

After his exit from Bigg Boss, he gained a mass fan following, namely on his Instagram page, where he got almost 46,000 followers in a span of just five days. His honesty and originality in Bigg Boss has consistently garnered him with a mass fan following, as well as his ability to point out others, analytical skills, personality, benevolence, silent jokes, and the respect he shows towards other contestants. He is also referred to as "Cibylaa" in the BB house and a "Married Bachelor".

Filmography

Film

Short Film

Music video appearance

Television

References

External links 

Living people
Tamil male television actors
Tamil male actors
Male actors in Tamil cinema
People from Tamil Nadu
Bigg Boss (Tamil TV series) contestants
1990 births